Cymbacha saucia is a crab spider found in Australia. The body length of the female is up to 7 mm, the male 4 mm. A cryptic small species, the colour is usually brown, grey and black. Often found in a folded leaf, used as a retreat.

See also
 List of Thomisidae species

References

Thomisidae
Spiders of Australia
Spiders described in 1874